The Baluan Sholak Sports Palace or Bolyan Sholak Sports Palace is a Palace of Sports in Almaty, the former capital of Kazakhstan. It was built in 1967 and extensively renovated in 2009–2011. It is named after Baluan Sholak, a celebrated Kazakh composer, singer, poet, dombra player, dzhigit and wrestler.

It is the home arena for Aisulu Almaty, a women's ice hockey team based in Almaty.

History 
Built in 1967 by order of the State Committee for Physical Culture and Sports under the Council of Ministers of the Kazakh SSR. At the time of construction it had the main hall with 4 stands for 6 thousand seats, machine room for preparation of artificial ice, medical and methodological rooms. In the courtyard of the Palace of Sports international, all-Union and republican competitions in boxing, basketball and karate were held. Variety and ballet performances on ice, international exhibitions and national fairs were organized. The building has an extended first floor. On the main facade there is a loggia with solid stained glass window and a blind fence on the sides. In the middle section a long ramp is located in front of the entrance doors. The courtyard facade has large stained glass windows and a gate in the middle instead of the loggia. The first floors of the side facades are decided on a combination of blank wide smooth corner partitions and a frieze with solid stained glass. In the middle part between the doors are wide blank partitions with a low, polychrome two-colour relief of sports themes. On the main and courtyard facades the high blank wall has an arched gable and its surface is covered with large triangular prisms, which are symmetrically offset to each other and alternate in vertical rows. On the main facade on the upper left side of the shield is an applied flat-relief metal composition depicting runners with a torch; it is balanced by a parapet inscription of the full name of the structure on the right side of the entrance loggia. The upper part of the wall of the courtyard facade has a ribbon aperture. The upper stained glass windows of the side facades are covered with a four-row grid of flat rectangular plates placed obliquely. They are in pairs and are offset in relation to each other in adjacent rows. The western facade has a small loggia with a blank fence at the top. The team of architects: V. Katsev, I. Slonov, O. Naumova, V. Tolmachev and I. Tsitrin. On the eastern side of the building placed a sgraffito of graphic artist Yevgeny Sidorkin.

Location 
The Sports Palace is located in the center of the metropolis. It borders on the Central Stadium, the building of the "Promenade" shopping center, on the south side there is the "Astana" hotel, there are arrivals and exits to Abai Avenue and Baitursynov Street, next to the "Baikonur" metro station. The location of the palace in the center of Almaty turns a visit to the skating rink into a comfortable and enjoyable leisure time. The Baluan Sholak Palace of Sports and Culture is a universal demonstration sports facility with a one-time capacity of up to 5000 spectators.

Renovation
The renovation was undertaken in preparation for the 2011 Asian Winter Games, for staging the hockey, short track and figure skating events. The closing ceremony of the Games was also held in the Palace. The number of seats was increased to 5000, and support facilities such as gyms, locker rooms and a press centre were added, as well as a medical and rehabilitation complex, commentator booths and electronic displays. The plan also included multi-storey parking for 850 cars.

Events
Events held in the Palace of Culture and Sports have included:
15–16 May 2004 – 2004 Asian Judo Championships
1–7 July 2007 – 2007 Asian Women's Junior Handball Championship
19–25 December 2010 – 2010 Asian Women's Handball Championship
30 January – 6 February 2011 – 2011 Asian Winter Games ice hockey and closing ceremony
29 April – 1 May 2011 – semifinal and final of the 2010–11 UEFA Futsal Cup
14–20 September 2011 – 2011 Asian Women's Junior Handball Championship
14–15 January 2012 – 2012 World Judo Masters Championship
10–16 September 2012 – 2012 Asian Women's Cup Volleyball Championship
14–26 October 2013 – 2013 AIBA World Boxing Championships
28–29 September 2013 - Judo Grand Prix Almaty 2013
5–9 March 2014 – I Futsal Eremenko Cup final tournament
8–16 November 2014 – 2014 World Weightlifting Championships
8–14 November 2015 – 2015 Pacific-Asia Curling Championships
2–6 March 2016 – III Futsal Eremenko Cup final tournament
13–15 May 2016 - Judo Grand Prix Almaty 2016
5–7 February 2017 – Short track speed skating at the 2017 Winter Universiade
9–11 April 2021 – 2021 Asian Wrestling Olympic Qualification Tournament
13–18 April 2021 – 2021 Asian Wrestling Championships
19–22 December 2021 – 2021 Asian Karate Championships
25-30 December 2022 - World Rapid and Blitz Championships 2022

The building is also a venue for live concerts and entertainment.

References

2011 Asian Winter Games
Indoor ice hockey venues in Kazakhstan
Multi-purpose stadiums in Kazakhstan
Judo venues
Buildings and structures in Almaty